Åshöjdens BK is a book series about a fictional soccer club in northwestern Scania, Sweden, created by Max Lundgren

Plot
Appearing in a series of four novels, it depicts a soccer club being promoted across a promotion and relegation-based Swedish league system before losing the Allsvenskan qualifying game. In 1985, a TV series was made.

Sometimes, sports journalists talk of the "real Åshöjdens BK" when a club, often in rural districts, within some seasons quickly has been promoted from the lower to higher divisions. An example is Ljungskile SK's promotion during the early-mid 1990s.

Books
 Åshöjdens bollklubb (1967)
 Åshöjden går vidare (1968 
 Kris i Åshöjdens BK (1969)
 Åshöjden i kvalet (1971)

References

Fictional association football clubs
Series of children's books
Novels about association football
Works by Max Lundgren
Scania in fiction
Book series introduced in 1967